Ravindranauth Seeram (born 20 July 1961) is a Guyanese cricketer. He played in 41 first-class and 12 List A matches for Guyana from 1982 to 1992.

See also
 List of Guyanese representative cricketers

References

External links
 

1961 births
Living people
Guyanese cricketers
Guyana cricketers